Mardan may also refer to:

Places
 Muslim Abad, a village and union councils of Haripur District of Khyber Pakhtunkhwa, Pakistan
 Muslimabad, a neighbourhood of Landhi Town in Karachi, Sindh, Pakistan
 Muslimabad Kohat, a village of Kohat District of Khyber Pakhtunkhwa, Pakistan
 Muslimabad (Mardan), a village located in Mardan District, Khyber Pakhtunkhwa, Pakistan

Railway Station
 Muslimaabad railway station, is located in Pakistan